The 2000–01 NBA season was the thirteenth season for the Charlotte Hornets in the National Basketball Association. During the off-season, the Hornets acquired Jamal Mashburn, P.J. Brown and Otis Thorpe from the Miami Heat, and re-signed free agent Hersey Hawkins. The team won four of their first five games, then lost five straight, but then went on a six-game winning streak. The team posted two 7-game winning streaks in December, and between February and March, and held a 26–25 record at the All-Star break. The Hornets finished the season third in the Central Division with a 46–36 record, and qualified for their sixth Playoff appearance.

Mashburn averaged 20.1 points, 7.6 rebounds and 5.4 assists per game, while David Wesley averaged 17.2 points, 4.4 assists and 1.6 steals per game, and second-year guard Baron Davis showed improvement stepping into the lineup, averaging 13.8 points, 7.3 assists and 2.1 steals per game. In addition, Elden Campbell provided the team with 13.1 points, 7.8 rebounds and 1.8 blocks per game, and Brown contributed 8.5 points and 9.3 rebounds per game, and was named to the NBA All-Defensive Second Team. Derrick Coleman was replaced with Brown in the lineup at power forward, averaging 8.1 points and 5.4 rebounds per game off the bench, but only played just 34 games due to an irregular heartbeat and weight problems.

In the playoffs, the Hornets all wore headbands to show team unity, as they swept the 3rd-seeded Miami Heat in three straight games in the Eastern Conference First Round. In the Eastern Conference Semi-finals, they took a 3–2 series lead over the 2nd-seeded Milwaukee Bucks, but were eliminated three games to four. Following the season, Coleman was traded back to his former team, the Philadelphia 76ers, while second-year forward Eddie Robinson signed as a free agent with the Chicago Bulls, and Hawkins and Thorpe both retired.

In March, the Hornets applied with the NBA to move the team to Memphis, Tennessee for the following season. However, they withdrew their application due to the rise of their home-game attendance during the playoffs, after sweeping the Heat in the first round, and with a capacity crowd of 22,283 in a 94–79 Game 3 home win over the Heat at the Charlotte Coliseum. The Hornets finished twenty-first in the NBA in attendance for the season.

Draft picks

Roster

Regular season

Season standings

Record vs. opponents

Game log

Playoffs

|- align="center" bgcolor="#ccffcc"
| 1
| April 21
| @ Miami
| W 106–80
| Jamal Mashburn (28)
| P. J. Brown (7)
| Baron Davis (8)
| American Airlines Arena20,085
| 1–0
|- align="center" bgcolor="#ccffcc"
| 2
| April 23
| @ Miami
| W 102–76
| Jamal Mashburn (22)
| P. J. Brown (8)
| Baron Davis (4)
| American Airlines Arena16,500
| 2–0
|- align="center" bgcolor="#ccffcc"
| 3
| April 27
| Miami
| W 94–79
| Davis, Mashburn (21)
| P. J. Brown (12)
| Jamal Mashburn (8)
| Charlotte Coliseum22,283
| 3–0

|- align="center" bgcolor="#ffcccc"
| 1
| May 6
| @ Milwaukee
| L 92–104
| Jamal Mashburn (23)
| Elden Campbell (13)
| Baron Davis (7)
| Bradley Center18,717
| 0–1
|- align="center" bgcolor="#ffcccc"
| 2
| May 8
| @ Milwaukee
| L 90–91
| David Wesley (20)
| P. J. Brown (11)
| David Wesley (7)
| Bradley Center18,717
| 0–2
|- align="center" bgcolor="#ccffcc"
| 3
| May 10
| Milwaukee
| W 102–92
| Jamal Mashburn (36)
| P. J. Brown (16)
| three players tied (6)
| Charlotte Coliseum17,392
| 1–2
|- align="center" bgcolor="#ccffcc"
| 4
| May 13
| Milwaukee
| W 85–78
| Jamal Mashburn (31)
| P. J. Brown (13)
| Baron Davis (7)
| Charlotte Coliseum18,756
| 2–2
|- align="center" bgcolor="#ccffcc"
| 5
| May 15
| @ Milwaukee
| W 94–86
| Jamal Mashburn (24)
| Elden Campbell (10)
| Jamal Mashburn (8)
| Bradley Center18,717
| 3–2
|- align="center" bgcolor="#ffcccc"
| 6
| May 17
| Milwaukee
| L 97–104
| David Wesley (27)
| Jamal Mashburn (9)
| Jamal Mashburn (7)
| Charlotte Coliseum23,509
| 3–3
|- align="center" bgcolor="#ffcccc"
| 7
| May 20
| @ Milwaukee
| L 95–104
| Baron Davis (29)
| Elden Campbell (10)
| Jamal Mashburn (9)
| Bradley Center18,717
| 3–4
|-

Player statistics

Season

Playoffs

Awards and records
 P.J. Brown, NBA All-Defensive Second Team
 Baron Davis, longest field goal in NBA history at 89 feet distance on February 17, 2001

Transactions
 August 1, 2000

Traded Ricky Davis, Dale Ellis, Eddie Jones and Anthony Mason to the Miami Heat for P.J. Brown, Rodney Buford, Tim James, Jamal Mashburn and Otis Thorpe.
 September 21, 2000

Signed Hersey Hawkins as a free agent.
 October 2, 2000

Signed Terrance Roberson as a free agent.

Waived Rodney Buford.
 December 19, 2000

Waived Terrance Roberson.
 January 26, 2001

Signed Doug Overton to a 10-day contract.
 April 10, 2001

Signed Scott Burrell to a contract for the rest of the season.

Player Transactions Citation:

References

Charlotte Hornets seasons
Char
Charlotte Hornets
Charlotte Hornets